Daníel Guðni Guðmundsson (born 17 November 1986) is an Icelandic basketball coach and a former player. During his playing career, he won the Icelandic Basketball Cup in 2014, and the Icelandic Super Cup three times, in 2004, 2006 and 2013.

Playing career
Daníel came up through the junior ranks of Njarðvík and appeared in his first senior games with the club during the 2004–2005 Úrvalsdeild karla season. He spent the following season with 1. deild karla club FSu before returning to Njarðvík in 2006.

In 2008, Daníel signed with newly promoted Breiðablik. In 16 games, he averaged 8.6 points and helped Breiðablik to an 8th-place finish and a seat in the playoffs. The following season, Daníel averaged a career high 11.0 points per game but the team was unable to reproduce the previous season success and ended being relegated with a 5-17 record. During the summer, he signed with Stjarnan. Daníel appeared in 32 regular season and playoffs games for Stjarnan, averaging 6.0 points per game, and helping the team reach the 2011 Úrvalsdeild Finals where they eventually lost to KR.

During the summer of 2011, Daníel moved to Sweden and joined IK Eos. He missed all but one game of the 2011–2012 season due to a back injury but appeared in 9 games in the Basketettan for the first half of the 2012–2013 season, averaging 6.1 points per game, before returning to Iceland and signing with Grindavík for the second half of the season. He played for Grindavík until 2016, helping the club win the national championship in 2013.

Titles
Icelandic champion
 2013
Icelandic Basketball Cup
 2014
Icelandic Super Cup
 2004, 2006, 2013

Coaching career
In 2015, Daníel was hired as the head coach of Grindavík women's team. He guided the team to the Icelandic Cup finals where it lost to Snæfell 78–80. In the Úrvalsdeild playoffs, Grindavík took a commanding 2–0 lead against heavy favorites Haukar in the semi-finals before losing three straight and the series 2–3.

In April 2016, Daníel was hired as the head coach of Njarðvík. His first season at the helm proved to be a disappointing one as Njarðvík missed out on the playoffs for the first time since 1993 after losing to Þór Þorlákshöfn in the last game of the season. The team bounced back the following season, finishing fifth in the league. After being swept by eventual champions KR in the first round of the 2018 playoffs, Njarðvík chose not to give Daníel a contract extension.

After serving as an assistant coach to both Grindavík's men's and women's teams for the 2018–2019 season, Daníel was hired as the head coach Grindavík men's team in April 2019. He guided Grindavík to the Icelandic Cup Finals in February 2020 where it lost to Stjarnan.

On 21 February 2022, Daníel was let go by Grindavík with five games left of the season and the team in 6th place.

In May 2022, Daníel was hired as an assistant coach to Benedikt Guðmundsson at Njarðvík men's team.

References

External links
Icelandic statistics 2008–2017 at Icelandic Basketball Federation
Úrvalsdeild statistics 2004–2007 at Icelandic Basketball Federation
Swedish statistics

1986 births
Daniel Gudni Gudmundsson
Living people
Daniel Gudni Gudmundsson
Daniel Gudni Gudmundsson
Daniel Gudni Gudmundsson
Daniel Gudni Gudmundsson
Daniel Gudni Gudmundsson
Daniel Gudni Gudmundsson
Daniel Gudni Gudmundsson
Daniel Gudni Gudmundsson
Daniel Gudni Gudmundsson
Daniel Gudni Gudmundsson
Daniel Gudni Gudmundsson
Daniel Gudni Gudmundsson